C. nobilis may refer to:
 Chamaeza nobilis, the striated antthrush, a bird species found in Bolivia, Brazil, Colombia, Ecuador and Peru
 Clivia nobilis, the drooping clivia, a plant species

See also
 Nobilis (disambiguation)